Alta is an unincorporated community in Fayette County, West Virginia, United States. Alta is located on state routes 16 and 39, north of Gauley Bridge.

References

Unincorporated communities in Fayette County, West Virginia
Unincorporated communities in West Virginia